The 17th Asianet Film Awards, honoring the best Malayalam films of 2014, were held on 11 January 2015 at Kochi Port Trust Stadium, Willingdon Island, Kochi. The title sponsor of the event was Ujala.

Film award winners

Special awards

External links
 Official Website on hotstar

References

A
Asianet Film Awards